Mitrī al-Murr (also Mitri El Murr; 7 November  1880 – 31 August 1969) was a Lebanese deacon, composer, scholar and the Archon Protopsaltis (first cantor) of the Greek Orthodox Church of Antioch, from 1912 until his death. He was born in Tripoli.

He is known for his sophisticated compositions of Orthodox Church music.

References

1880 births
1969 deaths
People from Tripoli, Libya